Myocheong (Hangul: 묘청, Hanja: 妙淸) was a Korean Buddhist monk and geomancer of the royal court of the Goryeo dynasty.

Myocheong's Rebellion
During the reign of King Injong of Goryeo, Myocheong argued that Goryeo had become weakened by Confucian ideals. His views directly conflicted with Gim Busik, a China-oriented Confucian scholar. On a broader scale, this represented the ongoing struggle between the Confucian and Buddhist elements in Korean society.

It was during this period that the Jin dynasty of China was exerting pressure on Goryeo. The trouble with the Jin dynasty was partly due to Goryeo's underestimation of the newly established state and the ill treatment of its envoys (i.e. killing them and humiliating their corpse). Taking advantage of the situation, Myocheong purposed to attack the Jin dynasty and that moving Goryeo's capital to Pyongyang would assure success.

King Injong was persuaded by Myocheong. However, the rest of the royal court and bureaucracy did not support the move, and the king had to back out of his commitments to Myocheong.

Frustrated at the resistance of the southern elites (who feared losing their dominant position) against moving the capital to the former Goguryeo capital and reclaim former Goguryeo lands in Manchuria, Myocheong led a rebellion against the Goryeo government and formed a breakaway regime. He established in Pyongyang, known as Seo-gyeong (西京, “Western Capital”) at the time, his new state of Daewi (大為; 대위). According to Myocheong, the Goryeo capital of Kaesong was "depleted of virtue." This made Pyongyang the ideal location for the supposed dynastic revival.

The rebellion was crushed by forces led by the scholar-general Gim Busik.

See also
History of Korea
Goryeo
Shin Chaeho

References

External links 
 Myocheong 
 Myocheong 

12th-century Korean people
Goryeo Buddhist monks
Geomancy